The Brau people are an ethnic group living in Laos, Cambodia, and Vietnam. In Vietnam, most Brau live in Đắc Mế village, Bờ Y commune, Ngọc Hồi district, Kon Tum province (Đặng, et al. 2010:112), and the population was 525 in 2019. Their ancestors came from southern Laos and northeastern Cambodia, migrating to Vietnam around 150 years ago. They speak Brao, a Mon–Khmer language.

The Brau have only two surnames: Thao (for male) and Nang (for female). They tell about the Great Flood in their Un cha đắc lếp story, and about the Creator god named Pa Xây. They play Táp đinh bố - a kind of K'lông pút, and Tha - a special kind of gong.

The Brau have traditional customs such as uốt bưng (filing teeth), síp tiêu (strain ears), and chingkrackang (tattoo on forehead).

In their traditions, close to nature and hunting, belongs capture, taming and training of elephants, referred to as Ruhe in the Brau Language, and the last four elephants belonging to Airavata Elephant Foundation in Ratanakiri Province in Cambodia, are cared for, by mahouts of the Brau people. In 26th of December, the first elephant baby born in 30 years were born here.

References 

Đặng Nghiêm Vạn, Chu Thái Sơn, Lưu Hùng. 2010. Ethnic Minorities in Vietnam. Hà Nội: Thế Giới Publishers.

Ethnic groups in Vietnam